Espie or Espié is a surname. Notable people with the surname include:

Colin Espie (born 1957), Scottish neuroscientist
Jock Espie (1868–1911), Scottish footballer
Stan Espie, Irish lawn bowl player
Thierry Espié (born 1952), French motorcycle racer